Lary Walker is an American neuroscientist and researcher at Emory University in Atlanta, Georgia. He is Associate Director of the Goizueta Alzheimer's Disease Research Center at Emory, and he is known for his research on the role of abnormal proteins in the causation of Alzheimer’s disease.

Education and career 
Walker received his Bachelor of Science degree from Louisiana State University, and his Master of Science and PhD degrees from Tulane University. Following a  German Academic Exchange (DAAD) Fellowship at the University of Kassel and a National Institutes of Health (NIH) postdoctoral fellowship at Emory University, he moved to the Neuropathology Laboratory of Donald L. Price at Johns Hopkins University, where he began work on the biological basis of Alzheimer's disease. In 1995 he became head of the Alzheimer's disease drug discovery program at  Parke-Davis/Warner-Lambert in Ann Arbor, Michigan. In 2003 he returned to Emory University, where he is the Marie and E.R. Snelling Professor of Neurology.

Research

Biology of Aβ (senile) plaques 
Walker's early research established that a variety of  neurons are involved in the formation of Aβ  plaques, one of the pathological hallmarks of Alzheimer's disease. With Dale Schenk at Athena Neurosciences (later part of Élan Pharmaceuticals), he discovered that  antibodies to the Aβ protein can enter the brain from the cerebrospinal fluid and selectively bind to Aβ plaques and  cerebral Aβ-amyloid angiopathy (CAA). Based on his work with animal models of Alzheimer's disease, Walker has proposed that humans are uniquely vulnerable to Alzheimer's disease.

Prion-like properties of disease-causing proteins 
Since the late 1990s, Walker's research has been directed toward the mechanisms that drive the misfolding and aggregation of the Aβ protein in the living brain. In collaboration with Mathias Jucker at the University of Tübingen, he discovered that the accumulation of Aβ can be initiated in transgenic mouse models by a prion-like mechanism in which 'seeds' of abnormal Aβ precipitate the formation of plaques and CAA. In 2000, Walker and Harry LeVine introduced the term 'proteopathy' (also known as 'proteinopathy') to describe diseases characterized by the misfolding and aggregation of proteins. This terminology has been applied to a number of neurodegenerative disorders and amyloidoses, including  tauopathies such as Pick's disease,  synucleinopathies such as Parkinson's disease and Lewy Body Dementia, systemic amyloidoses, and others.

Awards 
Walker received the Metlife Foundation Award for Medical Research in Alzheimer's Disease in 2014, the Alexander von Humboldt Research Award in 2016, and the Peter Bassoe Lectureship of the American Neuropsychiatric Association in 2017.

Bibliography

Selected reviews 

 “Seeds of Dementia”. Walker LC and Jucker M (2013). Scientific American 308: 52-57.  PMID: 23627220. https://DOI:10.1038/scientificamerican0513-52.
 “Mechanisms of protein seeding in neurodegenerative diseases” Walker LC, Diamond MI, Duff KE and Hyman BT (2013). JAMA Neurology 70: 304-310. PMID: 23599928. PMCID: PMC3665718. https://DOI:10.1001/jamaneurol.2013.1453.
 “Self-propagation of pathogenic protein aggregates in neurodegenerative diseases”. Jucker M and Walker LC (2013). Nature 501: 45-51. PMID: 24005412. PMCID: PMC3963807. https://DOI:10.1038/nature12481.
 “Neurodegenerative diseases: Expanding the prion concept”. Walker LC and Jucker M (2015). Annual Review of Neuroscience 38: 87-103. PMID: 25840008. PMCID: PMC4803040. https://DOI:10.1146/annurev-neuro-071714-033828.
 “Proteopathic strains and the heterogeneity of neurodegenerative diseases”. Walker LC (2016). Annual Review of Genetics 50: 329-346. PMID: 27893962. PMCID: PMC6690197. https://DOI:10.1146/annurev-genet-120215-034943.
 “Propagation and spread of pathogenic protein assemblies in neurodegenerative diseases”. Jucker M, Walker LC (2018). Nature Neuroscience 21: 1341-1349. PMID: 30258241. PMCID: PMC6375686. https://DOI:10.1038/s41593-018-0238-6.

Selected research reports 

 “Augmented senile plaque load in aged female β-amyloid precursor protein transgenic mice”. Callahan MJ, Lipinski WJ, Bian F, Durham RA, Pack A and Walker LC (2001). American Journal of Pathology 158: 1173-1177.  PMID: 11238065. PMCID: PMC1850367. https://DOI:10.1016/s0002-9440(10)64064-3.

 “Exogenous induction of Aβ-amyloidogenesis is governed by intrinsic properties of agent and host”. Meyer-Luehmann M, Coomaraswamy J, Bolmont T, Kaeser S, Schaefer C, Kilger E, Neuenschwander A, Abramowski D, Frey P, Jaton AL, Vigouret J, Paganetti P, Walsh DM, Mathews P, Ghiso J, Staufenbiel M, Walker LC and Jucker M (2006). Science 313: 1781-1784. PMID: 16990547. https://DOI:10.1126/science.1131864.

 “Deficient high-affinity binding of Pittsburgh Compound B in a case of Alzheimer's disease”. Rosen RF, Ciliax BJ, Gearing M, Dooyema J, Wingo T, Lah JJ, Ghiso JA, LeVine III H and Walker LC (2010). Acta Neuropathologica 119: 221-233. PMID: 19690877. PMCID: PMC3045810. https://DOI:10.1007/s00401-009-0583-3.

 “Exogenous seeding of cerebral β-amyloid deposition in βAPP-transgenic rats”. Rosen RF, Fritz JJ, Dooyema J, Cintron AF, Hamaguchi T, Lah JJ, LeVine III H, Jucker M and Walker LC (2012). Journal of Neurochemistry 120: 660-666. PMID: 22017494. PMCID: PMC3293176. https://DOI:10.1111/j.1471-4159.2011.07551.x.

 “Amyloid polymorphisms constitute distinct clouds of conformational variants in different etiological subtypes of Alzheimer's disease”. Rasmussen J, Mahler J, Beschorner N, Kaeser SA, Häsler LM, Baumann F, Nyström S, Portelius E, Blennow K, Lashley T, Fox NC, Sepulveda-Falla D, Glatzel M, Oblak AL, Ghetti B, Nilsson KPR, Hammarström P, Staufenbiel M, Walker LC and Jucker M (2017). Proceedings of the National Academy of Sciences USA 114: 13018-13023. PMID: 29158413. PMCID: PMC5724274. https://DOI:10.1073/pnas.1713215114.

Complete list of published work 

 https://scholar.google.com/citations?user=Ap8lgXEAAAAJ&hl=en&oi=sra
 http://www.ncbi.nlm.nih.gov/sites/myncbi/1feivrkCu97Q5/bibliography/41295477/public/?sort=date&direction=descending

Selected book chapters 

 “The neurobiology of aging in nonhuman primates”. Walker LC and Cork LC (1999). In: Alzheimer Disease, RD Terry, R Katzman, KL Bick and SS Sisodia, Eds., Lippincott Williams and Wilkins, Philadelphia, PA, pp 233-243.

 “Pathogenic protein strains as diagnostic and therapeutic targets in Alzheimer’s disease”. Walker LC, Rosen RF and LeVine III H (2012).  In: Alzheimer's Disease: Targets for New Clinical Diagnostic and Therapeutic Strategies, R Wegrzyn and AS Rudolph, Eds., CRC Press, Boca Raton, FL, pp 231-247.

 “The prion-like properties of amyloid-β assemblies: Implications for Alzheimer’s disease”. Walker LC, Schelle J and Jucker M (2017). In: Prion Diseases, SB Prusiner, Ed., Cold Spring Harbor Laboratory Press, pp 175-188.

 “Prion-like protein seeding and the pathobiology of Alzheimer's disease”. Walker LC (2018). In: Protein Folding Disorders in the Central Nervous System, J. Ghiso and A. Rostagno, Eds., World Scientific Publishing Company, pp 57-82.

References

External links 

 Seeded Aggregation and Transmissible Proteopathy—Creepy Stuff Not Just for Prions Anymore? Retrieved 2020-04-16.
 Abnormal proteins and Alzheimer's disease Retrieved 2020-04-16.
 Die Saat des Vergessens (Article on prion-like protein seeding in Alzheimer's disease) Retrieved 2020-04-15.
 Evidence of a ‘transmissible’ Alzheimer’s protein Retrieved 2020-04-16.
 Zwei Schritte vor, einen zurück (Article on the halting progress toward treatments for Alzheimer's disease) Retrieved 2020-04-15.
 Q&A with Lary C. Walker, Ph.D. Retrieved 2020-05-04.
 Protein Misfolding Diseases with Dr. Lary Walker Retrieved 2020-05-04.
 Alzheimer's, An Infectious Disease? Retrieved 2020-05-04.
 How do Neurodegenerative Diseases Progress? Retrieved 2020-05-04.
 Treatment from Brain Tissue May have Spread Alzheimer's Protein Retrieved 2020-05-04.
 Corrupted Proteins Spread Disease Retrieved 2020-05-04.
 Alzheimer's alphabet Retrieved 2020-05-04.

Living people
Tulane University alumni
Louisiana State University alumni
Johns Hopkins University alumni
Medical researchers
Alzheimer's disease researchers
Emory University faculty
1950 births